James Spratt may refer to:

James Spratt (Royal Navy officer) (1771–1853), officer in the Royal Navy
James Spratt (died 1880), American entrepreneur and founder of Spratt's
James Spratt, early settler of Blossom Park
James Spratt (Canadian politician) (1877–1960), Newfoundland builder and politician
Jimmy Spratt (1951–2021), Unionist politician from Northern Ireland